Babak Station ( – Īstgāh-e Bābak) is a village and railway station in Aliabad Rural District, in the Central District of Hashtrud County, East Azerbaijan Province, Iran. At the 2006 census, its population was 98, in 19 families.

References 

Towns and villages in Hashtrud County
Railway stations in Iran